Lactarius agglutinatus is a member of the large milk-cap genus Lactarius in the order Russulales. Found in North America, the species was first described in 1908 by mycologist Gertrude Simmons Burlingham.

See also 
 List of Lactarius species

References

External links 
 
 

agglutinatus
Fungi described in 1908
Fungi of North America